Trithemis donaldsoni is a species of dragonfly in the family Libellulidae. Common names include denim dropwing and Donaldson’s dropwing.

Distribution
This dropwing is found in southern and eastern Africa from South Africa and Namibia to Ethiopia. It is found in Angola, Botswana, the Democratic Republic of the Congo, Ethiopia, Kenya, Malawi, Mozambique, Namibia, South Africa, Tanzania, Uganda, Zimbabwe. Records from West Africa are doubtful because this species is very similar to Trithemis dejouxi.

Habitat
Natural habitats include streams and rivers in bush, savanna and woodland. Males are usually seen perching on rocks in mid-stream. Also found in some reservoirs.

References

External links

 Text for denim dropwing from South African Dragonfly Atlas 

donaldsoni
Taxonomy articles created by Polbot
Insects described in 1899